Humanistic education (also called person-centered education) is an approach to education based on the work of humanistic psychologists, most notably Abraham Maslow and Carl Rogers. Rogers is regarded as the founder of humanistic psychology and devoted much of his efforts toward applying the results of his psychological research to person-centered teaching where empathy, caring about students, and genuineness on the part of the learning facilitator were found to be the key traits of the most effective teachers. He edited a series of books dealing with humanistic education in his "Studies of the Person Series," which included his book, Freedom to Learn and Learning to Feel - Feeling to Learn - Humanistic Education for the Whole Man, by Harold C. Lyon, Jr. In the 1970s the term "humanistic education" became less popular after conservative groups equated it with "Secular Humanism" and attacked the writings of Harold Lyon as being anti-Christian. That began a successful effort by Aspy, Lyon, Rogers, and others to re-label it "person-centered teaching", replacing the term "humanistic education."  In a more general sense the term includes the work of other humanistic pedagogues, such as Rudolf Steiner, and Maria Montessori. All of these approaches seek to engage the "whole person": the intellect, feeling life, social capacities, and artistic and practical skills are all important focuses for growth and development. Important objectives include developing children's self-esteem, their ability to set and achieve appropriate goals, and their development toward full autonomy.

History
Humanistic education has its roots in Renaissance philosophers who emphasised the study of the humanities: grammar, rhetoric, history, poetry, and moral philosophy; these in turn built upon Classical models of education.

The growing Humanist-inspired emphasis on education in Scotland culminated with the passing of the Education Act 1496.

Principles

Choice and control 
The humanistic approach places a great deal of emphasis on students' choice and control over the course of their education. Students are encouraged to make choices that range from day-to-day activities to periodically setting future life goals. This allows for students to focus on a specific subject of interest for any amount of time they choose, within reason. Humanistic teachers believe it is important for students to be motivated and engaged in the material they are learning, and this happens when the topic is something the students need and want to know.

Felt concerns 
Humanistic education tends to focus on the felt concerns and interests of the students intertwining with the intellect. It is believed that the overall mood and feeling of the students can either hinder or foster the process of learning.

The whole person 
Humanistic educators believe that both feelings and knowledge are important to the learning process. Unlike traditional educators, humanistic teachers do not separate the cognitive and affective domains. This aspect also relates to the curriculum in the sense that lessons and activities provide focus on various aspects of the student and not just rote memorization through note taking and lecturing.

Self evaluation 
Humanistic educators believe that grades are irrelevant and that only self-evaluation is meaningful. Grading encourages students to work for a grade and not for intrinsic satisfaction. Humanistic educators disagree with routine testing because they teach students rote memorization as opposed to meaningful learning. They also believe testing doesn't provide sufficient educational feedback to the teacher.

Teacher as a facilitator 
"The tutor or lecturer tends to be more supportive than critical, more understanding than judgmental, more genuine than playing a role." Their job is to foster an engaging environment for the students and ask inquiry-based questions that promote meaningful learning.

Field studies on humanistic education
David Aspy and Flora Roebuck performed the largest field study ever done, in 42 states and 7 countries, in the 1970s and 80s, funded by the National Institute of Mental Health over a 12-year period, focusing on what led to achievement, creativity, more student thinking and interactivity, less violence, and both teacher and student satisfaction. Their conclusions corroborated the earlier findings of Carl Rogers's that the more effective teachers were empathic, caring for or prizing their students, and were authentic or genuine in their classroom presence. In 2010 Jeffrey Cornelius-White and Adam Harbaugh published a large meta-analysis on Learner Centered Instruction including in their analysis all the higher quality studies on person-centered or humanistic education ever done since 1948. In 2013, Rogers, Lyon, and Tausch published On Becoming an Effective Teacher -- Person-centered Teaching, Psychology, Philosophy, and Dialogues with Carl R. Rogers and Harold Lyon, which contained Rogers' last unpublished work on teaching and documented the research results of four highly related, independent studies which comprise the largest collection of data ever accumulated to test a person-centered theory in the field of education.

In environment 
The environment in a school which focuses their practice on humanistic education tends to have a very different setting than a traditional school. It consist of both indoor and outdoor environments with a majority of time being spent outdoors. The indoor setting may contain a few tables and chairs, bean bags for quiet reading and relaxation, book shelves, hide-aways, kitchens, much color and art posted on the walls. The outdoor environment is very engaging for students. You might find tree houses, outdoor kitchens, sand boxes, play sets, natural materials, sporting activities, etc. The wide range of activities are offered for students allowing for free choices of interest.

Related movements
A number of contemporary school movements incorporate humanistic perspectives within a larger, holistic context: these include the Waldorf, Montessori, Reggio Emilia, and Neohumanist schools. These originated independently of the humanistic psychology movement and at least some of them incorporate spiritual perspectives absent from the traditional humanistic approach.

See also
 Democratic school
 Humanistic psychology
 Learning theory
 Liberal education
 Music for People
 Progressive education
 Sudbury school
 Waldorf education

References

External links

"The New Humanistic education at Gurukul" - possibly an example of new humanistic education
"The New School at Dawson College" - possibly an example of humanistic education at the community college level

Alternative education
Philosophy of education
Humanism